Lulu is a collaboration album between rock singer-songwriter Lou Reed and heavy metal band Metallica. It was released as a double album on October 31, 2011, by Warner Bros. in the U.S. and Vertigo elsewhere. The album is the final full-length studio recording project that Reed was involved in before his death in October 2013. It was recorded in San Rafael, California, during April to June 2011, after Reed had played with Metallica at the Rock and Roll Hall of Fame's 25th Anniversary Concert which led to them wanting to collaborate. The lead single, titled "The View", was released on September 27, 2011.

Conceptually, the album is based on the two "Lulu plays" by the German playwright Frank Wedekind (1864–1918). The majority of composition is centered on spoken word delivered by Reed over instrumentals composed by Metallica, with occasional backing vocals provided by Metallica lead vocalist James Hetfield. Reed wrote the majority of the lyrics. The album was released worldwide on October 31, 2011, and on November 1 in North America. Upon its release, Lulu received mixed reviews, and an extremely negative response from many fans and several prominent critics. As of March 2023, Lulu has sold 280,000 copies worldwide.

Background
Lou Reed and Metallica had both been on the bill in October 1997 for the eleventh of Neil Young's Bridge School Benefit concerts. The conception of the collaboration project began in 2009 when both Metallica and Reed performed at the Rock and Roll Hall of Fame's 25th Anniversary Concert. After that performance, they began "kicking around the idea of making a record together," but did not start working together until two years later. In February 2011, Metallica guitarist Kirk Hammett announced that in May 2011 the group would start working on something that's "not 100 percent a Metallica record. It's a recording project, let's put it that way." The project was revealed to be a collaboration with Lou Reed once the recording of the album had been completed in June 2011.

The collaboration was originally intended to be Metallica re-recording various previously unreleased tracks Reed had written over the years. Among these unreleased demos was a collection of songs composed for a play called Lulu—a theatrical production of two plays originally written by the German playwright Frank Wedekind. Reed shared the demos of these songs with the members of Metallica to help bring the "piece to the next level," and the group provided "significant arrangement contributions" to the material. David Fricke of Rolling Stone heard at least two of the songs from the project in June 2011—"Pumping Blood" and "Mistress Dread"—and described their sound as a "raging union of [Reed's] 1973 noir classic, Berlin, and Metallica's '86 crusher, Master of Puppets." All tracks were made available for listening on the official Lou Reed & Metallica website before its release. Reed stated that "Everything is cut live – us staring at each other, playing". The recording was problematic at times, with Lars Ulrich admitting that at one point Lou Reed challenged him to a "street fight".

Singles

"The View" was released for streaming online in late September 2011. Examining reaction to the track and a previously released 30-second preview of the same, The New Zealand Herald reported that there was much negative reaction by fans online, and that the song had about twice as many dislikes as likes on YouTube. Not all reaction to the song was negative; Rolling Stone gave "The View" a 4 out of 5 star rating while the same song was rated 4.5 out of 5 by Artist Direct and positively by One Thirty BPM. The song's music video was directed by Darren Aronofsky, with cinematography by Matthew Libatique and produced by Scott Franklin through Protozoa Pictures, his and Aronofsky's production company. Originally it was planned that Aronofsky should helm a performance video for the album's second single "Iced Honey" but "when everyone got together, it became obvious 'The View' was the way to go."

Reception

Lulu received polarized reviews from critics. At Metacritic, which assigns a normalized rating out of 100 to reviews from mainstream critics, Lulu received an average score of 45, based on 31 reviews. Staff reviewer Joseph Viney of Sputnikmusic rated it one and a half out of five and commented "The fallout from this could have dire consequences. A lot of people, already placing Metallica at the best seat in the house at the Last Chance Saloon have now called last orders. It's genuinely difficult to guess what their next move will be. As for Reed, his legacy, whatever that means in his case, is cemented and this will have no real effect on him."

Pitchfork critic Stuart Berman assigned the album a rare 1.0 rating, writing "for all the hilarity that ought to ensue here, Lulu is a frustratingly noble failure. Audacious to the extreme, but exhaustingly tedious as a result, its few interesting ideas are stretched out beyond the point of utility and pounded into submission." Essayist and pop culture writer Chuck Klosterman, in his review for the website Grantland, wrote, "If the Red Hot Chili Peppers acoustically covered the 12 worst Primus songs for Starbucks, it would still be (slightly) better than this." Reviewer Julian Marszalek of The Quietus gave it a very negative review, commenting that "the effect is that of Lou Reed ranting over some Metallica demos that were never intended for human consumption." Marszalek summarized the review by suggesting that time spent listening to Lulu could have been better spent watching grass grow, "or perhaps wanking into a sock." Furthermore, longtime reviewer Don Kaye, who had previously defended Metallica's much-maligned 2003 album St. Anger, wrote on Blabbermouth.net that "Lulu is a catastrophic failure on almost every level, a project that could quite possibly do irreparable harm to Metallica's career."

The German edition of Metal Hammer gave it four out of seven stars. The reaction of the reviewer, Metallica biographer Joel McIver, was mixed. According to McIver, Lou Reed and Metallica had created an "avant-garde theatrical" soundtrack that is "not easy to listen to" and recommendable for Lou Reed fans. However Metallica fans "will mostly ignore Lulu—and listen to Master of Puppets".

In contrast with the negative reviews, J. R. Moores of Drowned In Sound however, gave the album a perfect score of 10 out of 10, praised the album as 'the second greatest record ever made in the history of the human ear drum' after Metal Machine Music. The review was misunderstood to be a joke as the writer stated that every point he mentioned about Lulu is sincere; saying the album is the most interesting Metallica album and Lou Reed's most enjoyable lyrics. In a review titled "Metallica and Lou Reed's 'Lulu' Is Actually Excellent", James Parker of The Atlantic wrote "I don't think the record is crap. In fact I love it... Give Lulu a shot. Give it another listen. Offer it what Lou would call your 'coagulating heart,' and you will be rewarded."

In the British avant-garde music magazine The Wire, David Keenan wrote "Metallica's unrelenting sledgehammer style works as the perfect complement to Reed's vision of compassionless love" and concluded "[a]gainst all the odds, Lulu functions as the ultimate realisation of Reed's aesthetic of Metal Machine Music, cruel vulgar, half in love with power and pain but with a bruised, beating heart at its centre." Uncut gave the record a positive review, singling out the closer "Junior Dad" for praise and calling it "breathtaking" and "astonishing", a "perfect ending to the most extraordinary, passionate and just plain brilliant record either participant has made for a long while." NME, scoring the record seven out of ten, praised it as "a surprising triumph", and said that the offering's "breadth and ambition is to be applauded. Metallica have performed way beyond what many thought them capable; they improvise freely as Reed's musical bitch, while for him this marks his most outré offering since Metal Machine Music". The Telegraph awarded Lulu three stars out of five, stating that while it was "grueling, even by latter Lou Reed standards," the sense of "unrestrained folly" and sheer lack of commercialism made the album feel "important".

Additional praise was received for the album when Lulu reached number nine on The Wire 'year-end critics' poll. Indeed, The Wires Jennifer Lucy Allan commented about the bad reviews: "ultimately, the reaction to it is a testament to Lou Reed's ability to still get up the noses and under the skin of even the most open-minded listeners. He's probably laughing his head off at it all this very minute." Moreover, Mattin in his review of Lulu for Volcanic Tongue agreed when Lou Reed said "This is the best thing ever done by anybody" and he adds "Lulu is more Lou Reed than Lou Reed and that surely means that this is the best thing ever done by anybody."

In a piece published on the day of Reed's death, Robert Christgau wrote that Lulu "probably didn't get enough" "mazel tov" from critics.

At Lou Reed's 2015 posthumous induction into the Rock and Roll Hall of Fame, Reed's widow Laurie Anderson announced that David Bowie had referred to Lulu as Reed's "greatest work". LCD Soundsystem's James Murphy later said Bowie had told him Lulu was "some of the best writing Lou's done. People are making a snap judgment and they aren't listening."

Response to criticism
Reed stated that Metallica fans threatened to shoot him due to the collaboration on Lulu. In response to this and the overall negative reaction to the album, Reed commented, "I don't have any fans left. After Metal Machine Music (1975), they all fled. Who cares? I'm essentially in this for the fun of it." Metallica drummer Lars Ulrich also noted the negative reaction to Lulu, and stated that he wasn't surprised by the criticism due in part because, "In 1984, when hard-core Metallica fans heard acoustic guitars on 'Fade to Black', there was a nuclear meltdown in the heavy-metal community," and also noted that Reed's poetry is "not for everyone." Talking about the negative reactions, frontman James Hetfield expressed understanding of "fearful people", who are "typing from their mom's basement that they still live in", stating that the band needed "to spread our wings" and try something new, while Reed stated that the album is for "literate people". Robert Trujillo spoke about the album saying, "Love it or hate it, it was definitely something that we enjoyed and that we embraced."

Following Reed's death, Ulrich wrote the following about Lulu in The Guardian:

Commercial performance
In the United States, the album debuted at number 36 on the Billboard 200 with first-week sales of 13,000 copies. This made it Reed's highest-charting release since Sally Can't Dance, which reached number 10 in 1974. Lulu debuted in the top 10 of the charts in eight countries. Despite this, sales fell off exponentially; three years after its release, the album had sold just under 33,000 copies in the US, well below the average sales of both Metallica and Lou Reed. As of March 2023, Lulu has sold 280,000 copies worldwide.

Track listing

PersonnelMusicians Lou Reed – lead vocals, Continuum, acoustic guitar
 James Hetfield – guitars, vocals
 Kirk Hammett – lead guitar, rhythm guitar on "Junior Dad"
 Robert Trujillo – bass
 Lars Ulrich – drumsAdditional personnel Sarth Calhoun – electronics
 Jenny Scheinman – violin, viola, string arrangements
 Gabe Witcher – violin
 Megan Gould – violin
 Ron Lawrence – viola
 Marika Hughes – cello
 Ulrich Maiss – cello on "Little Dog" and "Frustration"
 Rob Wasserman – stand up electric bass on "Junior Dad"
 Jessica Troy – viola on "Junior Dad"Production and design'
 Anton Corbijn – photographs for album packaging
 Stan Musilek – photographs for album cover and packaging
 Greg Fidelman – record producer, mixing and engineering
 Metallica – production
 Lou Reed – production
 Hal Willner – production
 Vlado Meller – mastering at Masterdisk NYC

Charts

References

External links

2011 albums
Lou Reed albums
Metallica albums
Avant-garde metal albums
Concept albums
Vertigo Records albums
Warner Records albums
Alternative metal albums
Collaborative albums
Albums produced by Lou Reed
Albums produced by Greg Fidelman
Albums produced by Hal Willner
Adaptations of works by Frank Wedekind